Trichodes octopunctatus is a beetle species of checkered beetles belonging to the family Cleridae, subfamily Clerinae. It can be found in Italy, Spain, and Balearic Islands.

References

octopunctatus
Beetles of Europe
Beetles described in 1787